Torsten Magnusson (born 9 April 1933) is a retired Swedish ice hockey player. Magnusson was part of the Djurgården Swedish champions' team of 1954.

References

External links

1933 births
Djurgårdens IF Hockey players
Swedish ice hockey forwards
Living people